The 2015–16 GFA League First Division is the 47th season of top-tier football in Gambia. The season began on 28 November 2015 and ended on 29 May 2016. 

The league comprises 12 teams. Gambia Ports Authority were the champions, so they earned a spot in the 2017 CAF Champions League. Wallidan and Banjul United were relegated to the GFA League Second Division.

League table

References

External links
League at FIFA
RSSSF competition history

GFA League First Division seasons
Premier League
Premier League
Gambia